Larabie may refer to:

 Ray Larabie (born 1970), computer font designer

See also

 Larrabee (disambiguation)
 Larabee (disambiguation)